Nordstromia fusca is a moth in the family Drepanidae. It was described by Hong-Fu Chu and Lin-Yao Wang in 1988. It is found in the Chinese provinces of Hubei and Fujian.

Adults can be distinguished from related species by the colour pattern, as well as the male genitalia.

References

Moths described in 1988
Drepaninae
Moths of Asia